Frederic Schindler (born 1980) is a French-Argentinean music supervisor who has worked on over 500 commercials and several films, most notably Aaron Brookner and Jim Jarmusch documentary Uncle Howard, Emir Kusturica feature On The Milky Road. and the Prada L'Homme et la Femme worldwide campaign featuring a bespoke cover by Perfume Genius of the iconic Pop Ballad Can't Help Falling in Love,. He won a Music Week Sync Award in 2017 for Best Online Advert.

Biography 
Frederic Schindler was born in Argentina where he attended the Lycée Franco-Argentin Jean Mermoz.  He started his career working for the French Ministère des Affaires Etrangères as a Deputy Attaché for the Cultural Services, promoting French cinema & music in South America. He then became Managing Director of the Spanish language version of the French music magazine Les Inrockuptibles.

He's the Founder of the creative music consultancy Too Young, the management company Bataille and the music curation service Movement. He worked on campaigns for Prada, Jean-Paul Gaultier, Helmut Lang, Hôtel Costes, Renault, Nina Ricci, Nike, Paco Rabanne, Ford, Corona, Mac Cosmetics, NGOs Casa Do Menor  and 30 Millions d'Amis, among others. His work also includes management and A&R for artists such as Benjamin Biolay, Colder, Andrea Balency  and Little Dragon.

He has been nominated for Best Sync at the Music + Sound Awards (2015, 2017  ) and in several categories (Best Music Supervisor, Best Film Soundtrack, Best Online Advert ) at the Music Week Sync Awards. He teaches at Pompeu Fabra University and had speaking engagements at the Future Music Forum, London Sync Sessions  and Primavera Sound.

He is a member of the Guild of Music Supervisors.

References 

1980 births
French music people
Argentine music people
Living people